Neoregostoma is a genus of beetles in the family Cerambycidae.

Species 
The Neoregostoma species contains the following species:

 Neoregostoma bettelai Clarke, 2010
 Neoregostoma coccineum (Gory in Guérin-Méneville, 1831)
 Neoregostoma discoideum (Audinet-Serville, 1833)
 Neoregostoma erythrocallum (Lane, 1940)
 Neoregostoma fasciatum (Aurivillius, 1920)
 Neoregostoma giesberti Clarke, 2007
 Neoregostoma luridum (Klug, 1825)
 Neoregostoma spinipenne (Fuchs, 1961)
 Neoregostoma unicolor (Aurivillius, 1920)

References

Rhinotragini